Peel is a 2019 British comedy-drama film co-produced and directed by Rafael Monserrate and starred by  Emile Hirsch. The movie was first shown on 7 February 2019 at the Santa Barbara International Film Festival.

Plot
A simple and good-hearted character, Peel Munter, is left lost and alone at the age of 30, when his over-protective mother dies. He has to learn to fend for himself, befriending neighbors, getting housemates to pay the mortgage, and finally reuniting with his long-lost brothers in a gentle coming-of-age story.

Cast
 Emile Hirsch as Peel Munter
 Jack Kesy as Roy, Peel's first housemate
 Shiloh Fernandez as Sam, Peel's brother
 Jacob Vargas as Chuck, the 2nd housemate
 Garrett Clayton as Chad, the 3rd housemate
 Amy Brenneman as Lucille, Peel's mother
Troy Hall as Will, Peel's older brother
 Yaya DaCosta as Sarah, Will's wife
Angelina Joo as Chun Ja, Peel's friend
Hana Hwang as Jooeun, Chun Ja's cousin

Release

Reception

 Noel Murray from the LA Times wrote: "The problem is that "Peel" is so persistently twee that when it tries to introduce heavier themes - involving the lasting damage family and friends thoughtlessly inflict on each other - the general sense of unreality gets in the way." Roger Moore from the website "Movie Nation" gave the movie only 1.5 stars out of 4, stating: "Hirsch is a gifted comic actor and could have made a lot more out of this unworldly guy who draws and snorkels obsessively and gets his hair cut about as often as Johnny Depp. And no, a few sweet moments in the final act don’t paper over the emptiness that precedes them. "Peel" is just as its title suggests, a movie that's all surface peel and no substance."

References

External links
 
 

2019 comedy-drama films
2019 films
British comedy-drama films
2010s English-language films
2010s British films